This is a list of listed buildings in Fredericia Municipality, Denmark.

Listed buildings

Delisted buildings

References

External links

 Danish Agency of Culture

Buildings and structures in Fredericia Municipality
Fredericia| 

da:Fredede bygninger i Fredericia Kommune